Stigmatomma is a genus of ants in the subfamily Amblyoponinae. The genus has a worldwide distribution, and like most other amblyoponines, Stigmatomma species are specialized predators. First described by Roger (1859), it was for a long time considered to be a synonym of Amblyopone until it was revived as an independent genus by Yoshimura & Fisher (2012) based on worker mandible morphology.

Species

Stigmatomma amblyops Karavaiev, 1935
Stigmatomma annae (Arnol'di, 1968)
Stigmatomma awa (Xu & Chu, 2012)
Stigmatomma bellii (Forel, 1900)
Stigmatomma besucheti (Baroni Urbani, 1978)
Stigmatomma bolabola Esteves & Fisher, 2016
Stigmatomma boltoni (Bharti & Wachkoo, 2011)
Stigmatomma bruni Forel, 1912
Stigmatomma caliginosum (Onoyama, 1999)
Stigmatomma crenatum (Xu, 2001)
Stigmatomma crypticum (Eguchi et al., 2015)
Stigmatomma denticulatum Roger, 1859
†Stigmatomma electrinum (Dlussky, 2009)
Stigmatomma emeryi Saunders, 1890
Stigmatomma eminia (Zhou, 2001)
Stigmatomma feae Emery, 1895
Stigmatomma ferrugineum (Smith, 1858)
Stigmatomma fulvidum (Terayama, 1987)
Stigmatomma gaetulicum (Baroni Urbani, 1978)
†Stigmatomma groehni (Dlussky, 2009)
Stigmatomma impressifrons Emery, 1869
Stigmatomma irayhady Esteves & Fisher, 2016
Stigmatomma janovitsika Esteves & Fisher, 2016
Stigmatomma kangba (Xu & Chu, 2012)
Stigmatomma liebe Esteves & Fisher, 2016
Stigmatomma luyiae Hsu et al., 2017
Stigmatomma luzonicum Wheeler & Chapman, 1925
Stigmatomma meilianum (Xu & Chu, 2012)
Stigmatomma minutum Forel, 1913
Stigmatomma mulanae (Xu, 2000)
Stigmatomma noonadan (Taylor, 1965)
Stigmatomma normandi Santschi, 1915
Stigmatomma octodentatum (Xu, 2006)
Stigmatomma ophthalmicum (Baroni Urbani, 1978)
Stigmatomma oregonense Wheeler, 1915
Stigmatomma pallipes (Haldeman, 1844)
Stigmatomma pertinax (Baroni Urbani, 1978)
Stigmatomma pluto (Gotwald & Lévieux, 1972)
Stigmatomma quadratum Karavaiev, 1935
Stigmatomma reclinatum (Mayr, 1879)
Stigmatomma roahady Esteves & Fisher, 2016
Stigmatomma rothneyi (Forel, 1900)
Stigmatomma rubiginoum (Wu & Wang, 1992)
Stigmatomma sakaii (Terayama, 1989)
Stigmatomma sakalava Esteves & Fisher, 2016
Stigmatomma santschii Menozzi, 1922
Stigmatomma scrobiceps (Guénard et al., 2013)
Stigmatomma silvestrii Wheeler, 1928
Stigmatomma testaceum (Motschoulsky, 1863)
Stigmatomma trigonignathum (Brown, 1949)
Stigmatomma trilobum (Xu, 2001)
Stigmatomma tsyhady Esteves & Fisher, 2016
Stigmatomma xui Bharti & Rilta, 2015
Stigmatomma zaojun (Terayama, 2009)
Stigmatomma zoma (Xu & Chu, 2012)
Stigmatomma zwaluwenburgi Williams, 1946

References

Roger, J. (1859). "Beiträge zur Kenntniss der Ameisenfauna der Mittelmeerländer." I. Berliner Entomologische Zeitschrift 3: 225–259.

External links

Amblyoponinae
Ant genera
Taxa named by Julius Roger